Kampong Salambigar is a village in Brunei-Muara District, Brunei. The population was 1,884 in 2016. It is one of the villages within Mukim Berakas 'B'. The postcode is BC1515.

Facilities 
Salambigar Religious School is the village's government school for the country's Islamic religious primary education.

The village mosque is Kampong Salambigar Mosque; it was built in 1995 and can accommodate 1,000 worshippers.

See also 
 Kampong Sungai Orok

References 

Salambigar